Gran Dorado was a holiday villages company based in the Netherlands. Until the merger in 2002, it was the biggest holiday villages company of Europe. Today's owner is the French company Pierre et Vacances, and is merged with the Center Parcs company.

History
Gran Dorado Resorts was originally found by the owner of the Dutch chain store company Vendex, famous for the Vroom & Dreesmann company. Therefore, the first name of the company was Vendorado. Vendorado Leisure N.V. was founded in 1980, in 1989, the name was changed to Gran Dorado Lesure N.V.

At the beginning of 1996, the company had 6 big holiday villages. In the same year, Gran Dorado took over another Dutch holiday villages company, called Creatief Vakantieparken. The company immediately grew to a company with 40 holiday villages and around 7500 bungalows, and was by then the biggest holiday villages company of Europe. The two companies were operating 2 years under the name Gran Dorado/Creatief, in 1998 the company acquired the new name Gran Dorado N.V.

Merger with Center Parcs
At the beginning of 2002, Pierre & Vacances became the overall owner of the Gran Dorado company. Shortly after, P&V took over the Center Parcs-chain from Scottisch & Newcastle. By that time, the two largest holiday villages companies were in the same hands. Halfway through the year, Center Parcs and Gran Dorado merged. The Netherlands Competition Authority did not allow a merger with all 40 holiday villages, so the following was decided:
 5 of the original Gran Dorado-villages will transfer to Center Parcs
 1 original Gran Dorado-village will transfer to RP Holidays
 the remaining 34 villages, of which a large part belonged to Creatief Vakantieparken, will transfer to Landal Greenparks.

Note: when nothing is written in either the column "Today's owner" or "Today's name", then the name of owner and park is still the same as in the columns "Name after merger" and "Owner after merger". A * indicates that the holiday village was first owned by Creatief Vakantieparken.

See also
 Center Parcs
 Landal Greenparks

References
 Dutch Wikipedia

External links
 Website of Landal Greenparks (with many Gran Dorado parks
 Website of Center Parcs (with 5 Gran Dorado parks

Hospitality companies of the Netherlands
Defunct hotel chains
Defunct companies of the Netherlands